Arhopala philander, is a butterfly in the family Lycaenidae. It was described by Cajetan and Rudolf Felder in 1865. It is found in the Australasian realm.

Subspecies
A. p. philander Obi, Bachan, Halmahera, Gebe, Sanghihe
A. p. leander (Evans, 1957)  New Guinea, Aru, Misool, Waigeu, Geelvink Bay, Karkar Island
A. p. ander  (Evans, 1957)  New Guinea
A. p. pratti (Evans, 1957)  Mioswar Island 
A. p. gander  (Evans, 1957)  Fergusson Island
A. p. meeki  (Evans, 1957)   New Hanover
A. p. gazella Fruhstorfer, 1914  Witu Island, New Britain
A. p. eichhorn  i (Evans, 1957)   New Ireland

References

External links
Arhopala Boisduval, 1832 at Markku Savela's Lepidoptera and Some Other Life Forms. Retrieved June 3, 2017.

Arhopala
Butterflies described in 1865